The 1987 Virginia Slims of Los Angeles was a women's tennis tournament played on outdoor hard courts at the Manhattan Beach Club in Manhattan Beach, California in the United States and was part of the Category 4 tier of the 1987 WTA Tour. The tournament ran from August 10 through August 16, 1987. Second-seeded Steffi Graf won the singles title and earned $50,000 first-prize money. As a result of her tournament win she became the world No. 1 ranked player for the first time in her career.

Finals

Singles
 Steffi Graf defeated  Chris Evert 6–3, 6–4
 It was Graf's 8th singles title of the year and the 16th of her career.

Doubles
 Martina Navratilova /  Pam Shriver defeated  Zina Garrison /  Lori McNeil 6–3, 6–4

References

External links
 ITF tournament edition details
 Tournament draws

Virginia Slims of Los Angeles
LA Women's Tennis Championships
Virginia Slims of Los Angeles
Virginia Slims of Los Angeles
Virginia Slims of Los Angeles
Virginia Slims of Los Angeles